Riccardo Gagno (born 26 July 1997) is an Italian professional footballer who plays as a goalkeeper for  club Modena.

Club career
He made his Serie B debut for Brescia on 26 August 2017 in a game against Avellino.

For 2019–20 season, he joined Modena on loan. On 21 August 2020 Modena bought out his rights on a permanent basis.

On 9 April 2022, he scored a injury-time winning goal in a crucial 2021–22 Serie C game against Imolese, by kicking the ball straight from his own area. The goal allowed Modena to stay four points clear of direct promotion with two games to go.

References

External links
 

1997 births
Living people
People from Montebelluna
Footballers from Veneto
Italian footballers
Association football goalkeepers
Serie B players
Serie C players
Serie D players
Calcio Montebelluna players
Brescia Calcio players
F.C. Grosseto S.S.D. players
U.S. Poggibonsi players
A.C. Mestre players
Ternana Calcio players
Modena F.C. players
Sportspeople from the Province of Treviso